A  (Hindi: चौकी , also spelled ,  and ) is a police workstation, gatehouse or police box in the Indian Police, and is the basic unit of police presence in any area. Each  is under the charge of a sub-inspector. There are typically more  than stations in a state police force, for example in Maharashtra.

References

Law enforcement equipment
Law enforcement in India